Cromptodon is an extinct genus of cynodonts from the Triassic of Cerro Bayo de Portrerillos, Cerro de las Cabras Formation, Argentina, South America. It is known only from PVL 3858, a mandible.

Description

The morphology and distribution of the cups on the postcanines is considered to be very similar to Thrinaxodon liorhinus differing in the fact that the cingulum is lingually wider. The coronoid, prearticular and angular processes, Bonaparte considered, were more developed than those in Thrinaxodon, being more similar to Tribolodon (now Bolotridon). The lower postcanines are buccolingually expanded.

Classification
Bonaparte originally classified Cromptodon as a galesaurid. In 1991, J. A. Hopson, pointed out a resemblance between the teeth of Cromptodon and juvenile Aleodon and reclassified Cromptodon as a chiniquodontid.  In 2003, Fernando Abdala and Norberto P. Giannini systematically described Chiniquodontidae and found both Cromptodon and Aleodon to fall outside of Chiniquodontidae as both lacked features their study found to be diagnostic of the family, although additional material was required to provide a definite taxonomic placement.

See also 
 List of therapsids

References 

Prehistoric cynodont genera
Anisian life
Middle Triassic synapsids of South America
Triassic Argentina
Fossils of Argentina
Fossil taxa described in 1972
Taxa named by José Bonaparte